The U-18 Asian Baseball Championship is an under-18 international baseball tournament sanctioned and created by the Baseball Federation of Asia (BFA). The tournament is prior to the 18U Baseball World Cup which is held every other year.

Results

1The tournament was supposed to take place in 2020, however, due to the COVID-19 pandemic, the competition has been cancelled.

Medal table

See also
 U-18 Baseball World Cup
 Asian Baseball Championship

References

Junior Baseball Championship
Youth baseball competitions
Asian Championship
Recurring sporting events established in 1994